Rhombomantis fusca is a species of mantid in the family Mantidae. It is found in Asia.

References

Further reading

 

Mantidae
Mantodea of Asia
Insects described in 1992